Ana Ristović (born 5 April 1972, Belgrade) is a Serbian poet and translator. She won the 2005 Hubert Burda Prize.

Life 
Ristović studied at the University of Belgrade Faculty of Philology.

In 2005, she won a residency at the Literary Colloquium Berlin. In 2010 and 2018, she was a guest of the International Literature Festival Berlin. In 2016, she was a guest of the International Poetry Festival Berlin. In 2018 to 2019, she was writer in residence in Berlin, of the German Academic Exchange Service. She was a 2018 National Book Critics Circle finalist.

She was an editor at Balcanis. Her work appeared in Asymptope, Prairie Schooner, and The New Yorker.

Works 

 Snovidna voda (Dreamwater),  1994.
 Uže od peska, (Rope of Sand), 1997.
 Zabava za dokone kćeri (Party for Lazybones Daughters), 1999.
 Život na razglednici (A Picture Postcard Life), 2003.
 Oko nule, (Around Zero), 2006.
 P.S – Selected Poems, 2009.
 Directions for Use: Selected Poems, Zephyr Press, Translated from Serbian by Steven Teref and Maja Teref, 2017.

References

External links 

 Circling Zero By Ana Ristovic
 ANA RISTOVIĆ  (Ана Ристовић) Lyric line

1972 births
Serbian poets
Serbian translators
Living people